Group 9 may refer to:

Group 9 element
Group 9 Rugby League